Tazilly is a commune in the Nièvre department in the Bourgogne-Franche-Comté region of central France. The inhabitants speak a dialect known as Tazillycois.

Demographics
On 1 January 2019, the estimated population was 191.

Economy
The economy in Tazilly is mainly agricultural (breeding Charolais cattle) and tourism.

History
During the Gallo-Roman era, Tazilly was located on the Roman road linking Decize and Autun.

In 1855, part of the town of Tazilly became the town of Flety.

See also
Communes of the Nièvre department

References

Communes of Nièvre